Dugald Livingstone (25 February 1898 – 15 January 1981), was a Scottish football player and manager.

He played fullback for Parkhead, Ashfield, Celtic, Dumbarton (loan), Everton, Plymouth Argyle, Aberdeen and Tranmere Rovers during his  playing career before going into management.

Livingstone managed Dutch side Sparta Rotterdam between 1949 and 1950. During his managerial career, Livingstone took charge of the Republic of Ireland from 1951 to 1953, before managing Belgium, guiding them to the 1954 FIFA World Cup and notably was in charge for the thrilling 4–4 draw with England in the group stages.

After success with Belgium he moved on to manage Newcastle United in 1954. Some supporters and staff were at first concerned that his tactics were in total contrast to those of his predecessor George Martin, but these doubts were laid to rest when he guided the team to FA Cup victory in 1955. The Newcastle board had the final say in which players would be playing during his spell at the club and they notably played Jackie Milburn for this final, against Livingstone's wishes. Milburn coincidentally scored in the match.

It was largely believed that Livingstone was unhappy with the amount of influence the board had on first team issues (although he never stated this). He left Newcastle in 1956 and went on to manage Fulham between 1956 and 1958 and then Chesterfield until 1962.

Honours 
Celtic
Scottish League: 1918–19

Newcastle United
FA Cup: 1954–55

References

External links
Plymouth Argyle profile

1898 births
1981 deaths
People from Alexandria, West Dunbartonshire
Footballers from West Dunbartonshire
Scottish footballers
Scottish football managers
Scottish expatriate football managers
Ashfield F.C. players
Celtic F.C. players
Dumbarton F.C. players
Everton F.C. players
Plymouth Argyle F.C. players
Aberdeen F.C. players
Tranmere Rovers F.C. players
Republic of Ireland national football team managers
Newcastle United F.C. managers
Fulham F.C. managers
1954 FIFA World Cup managers
Belgium national football team managers
Sparta Rotterdam managers
Expatriate football managers in the Netherlands
Expatriate football managers in Belgium
Expatriate football managers in the Republic of Ireland
Scottish expatriate sportspeople in the Netherlands
Scottish expatriate sportspeople in Belgium
Scottish expatriate sportspeople in Ireland
English Football League players
Scottish Football League players
Parkhead F.C. players
Sheffield United F.C. non-playing staff
Association football defenders
Scottish Junior Football Association players
FA Cup winning managers